Koreana (International title: Jenna / ) is a Philippine television drama series broadcast by GMA Network. Directed by Gil Tejada Jr., it stars Kris Bernal in the title role. It premiered on October 11, 2010 on the network's Haponalo line up. The series concluded on February 25, 2011 with a total of 100 episodes. It was replaced by My Lover, My Wife in its timeslot.

Cast and characters

Lead cast
 Kris Bernal as Jennifer "Jenny" Jung / Jenna Bartolome Jung

Supporting cast
 Rocco Nacino as Benjamin "Benjo" Bautista Jr.
 Eddie Garcia as Chang Hee Jung
 Eula Valdez as Violeta Jung / Violeta Salcedo
 Angelu de Leon as Nerissa Jung
 Saab Magalona as Ivy Jung
 Steven Silva as Joshua Lee
 Lotlot de Leon as Josefina Bartolome
 Sylvia Sanchez as Sandra Rosales
 Joyce Ching as Amy Shin
 Luigi Revilla as Jess Romano
 Marco Morales as Phillip Jung
 Catherine Kiok Lay as Cathy
 Ryza Cenon as Darlene Roces
 Gladys Guevarra as Ada
 Irene Lee as Louise Min
 Julienne Rosalio as Bebeng
 Dennis Roque as Larry Go
 Sarah Lahbati as Tamara Lee
 Janna Victoria as Maribel "Bel" Torres
 Mike Lloren as Melchor
 Dex Quindoza as Wen

Ratings
According to AGB Nielsen Philippines' Mega Manila People/Individual television ratings, the pilot episode of Koreana earned a 5.9% rating. While the final episode scored a 10.5% rating.

Accolades

References

External links
 

2010 Philippine television series debuts
2011 Philippine television series endings
Filipino-language television shows
GMA Network drama series
Television shows set in the Philippines